Chloryl fluoride is the chemical compound with the formula ClO2F. It is commonly encountered as side-product in reactions of chlorine fluorides with oxygen sources. It is the acyl fluoride of chloric acid.

Preparation
ClO2F was first reported by Schmitz and Schumacher in 1942, who prepared it by the fluorination of ClO2. The compound is more conveniently prepared by treatment of sodium chlorate and chlorine trifluoride and purified by vacuum fractionation, i.e. selectively condensing this species separately from other products. This species is a gas boiling at −6 °C:
6 NaClO3 + 4 ClF3 → 6 ClO2F + 2 Cl2 + 3 O2 + 6 NaF

Structure
In contrast to O2F2, ClO2F is a pyramidal molecule. This structure is predicted by VSEPR. The differing structures reflects the greater tendency of chlorine to exist in positive oxidation states with oxygen and fluorine ligands. The related Cl-O-F compound perchloryl fluoride, ClO3F, is tetrahedral.
The related bromine compound bromyl fluoride (BrO2F) adopts the same structure as ClO2F, whereas iodyl fluoride (IO2F) forms a polymeric substance under standard conditions.

References

External links
 WebBook page for ClO2F

Chloryl compounds
Oxyfluorides
Fluorides
Nonmetal halides
Gases
Substances discovered in the 1940s